The Eine is a river, just under  long in the German state of Saxony-Anhalt, which rises southeast of Harzgerode in the Harz mountains at  above sea level.

The Eine flows north of the B 242 federal road to Friedrichsrode in an easterly direction and then swings northeast into the Harz Foreland. The river channel runs through Alterode, Welbsleben and Westdorf to Aschersleben. The tributaries of the Eine are the Wiebeck, the Leine, the Schwennecke, the Mukarehne and the Langetalbach.

The Eine gives its name to the Wipper-Eine collective municipality.

References

See also
List of rivers of Saxony-Anhalt

Rivers of Saxony-Anhalt
Rivers of the Harz
Rivers of Germany